It's a Small World is a short-lived TV travel series which aired on the DuMont Television Network from June 27 to July 27, 1953.

Episode status
One episode is in the J. Fred MacDonald collection at the Library of Congress.

See also
List of programs broadcast by the DuMont Television Network
List of surviving DuMont Television Network broadcasts

References

Bibliography
David Weinstein, The Forgotten Network: DuMont and the Birth of American Television (Philadelphia: Temple University Press, 2004) 
Alex McNeil, Total Television, Fourth edition (New York: Penguin Books, 1980) 
Tim Brooks and Earle Marsh, The Complete Directory to Prime Time Network TV Shows, Third edition (New York: Ballantine Books, 1964)

External links
It's a Small World (TV series) at IMDB
DuMont historical website

DuMont Television Network original programming
1953 American television series debuts
1953 American television series endings
Black-and-white American television shows